Buffalo Church is a historic Methodist church located near Palestine, Wirt County, West Virginia, United States. It was built between 1884 and 1886, and is a one-story, oblong log structure with exterior weatherboarding of beech wood and interior finish of wood boards on walls and ceiling.  It is painted white on the inside and outside.  Also on the property is the church cemetery, and three outbuildings: two pit toilets and a storage building that were constructed by workers associated with the Work Projects Administration.

It was listed on the National Register of Historic Places in 1990.

References

External links
 

Churches on the National Register of Historic Places in West Virginia
Methodist churches in West Virginia
Churches completed in 1886
19th-century Methodist church buildings in the United States
Buildings and structures in Wirt County, West Virginia
Works Progress Administration in West Virginia
Cemeteries on the National Register of Historic Places in West Virginia
National Register of Historic Places in Wirt County, West Virginia
Wooden churches in West Virginia
Log buildings and structures on the National Register of Historic Places in West Virginia
Methodist cemeteries